is a Japanese tokusatsu web drama reboot of the 1987 television series Kamen Rider Black. A co-production between Ishimori Productions and Toei, the series is directed by Kazuya Shiraishi and was released worldwide through Amazon Prime Video on October 28, 2022. The series is part of the celebrations of the 50th anniversary of the Kamen Rider Series, also celebrating the 35th anniversary of Kamen Rider Black.

It received an 16+/18+ rating from Amazon Prime Video.

Plot

In the year 2022, Japan has entered a socio-political crisis since the government declared a coexistence between humans and the Kaijins, altered humans that came to be half a century ago via a classified government experiment. Aoi Izumi, a young human rights activist seeking to end Kaijin discrimination, meets two men named Kotaro Minami and Nobuhiko Akizuki, former members of the Gorgom movement that revere the dying Creation King. The clashing ideals between Kotaro and Nobuhiko will shatter their society’s status quo and determine the fate of all Kaijins.

Production
Plans for an adult-aimed Kamen Rider series were in place by 2019, planned for the franchise's 50th anniversary. Kazuya Shiraishi expressed interest in the project after learning of it from Toei producer Taisuke Furuya; A few months later, producer Shinichiro Shirakura offered Shiraishi the role of director, revealing the project to be a reboot of Kamen Rider Black.

Due to Shiraishi's inexperience in tokusatsu, Shirakura sought an experienced concept artist to help flesh out the visual style; Shiraishi requested veteran tokusatsu director Shinji Higuchi. Higuchi, having not been approached to work on Shin Kamen Rider (directed by his Shin Godzilla co-director Hideaki Anno), believed he "probably wouldn't become involved in Kamen Rider." However, after learning of Shiraishi's involvement and the Kamen Rider Black basis, Higuchi accepted. Higuchi then invited Kiyotaka Taguchi to serve as special effects director, which the latter "accepted without a second thought."

Shiraishi watched the original Kamen Rider Black in preparation for work on Black Sun. He began developing the story, focusing on the "sadness" of the original and emphasizing the relationship between Kohtaro Minami and Nobuhiko Akizuki. Similar to his previous works, Shiraishi also sought to tackle contemporary social issues within the story. Despite Toei aiming to appeal to adult viewers, Shiraishi hoped the series could be enjoyed by children as well. Principal photography wrapped in March 2022.

Announcement and marketing
The project was announced at a press conference on April 3, 2021, the 50th anniversary of Kamen Rider'''s first broadcast. Shiraishi was confirmed as director during the conference, stating "the thought of being in charge of this amazing reboot of Kamen Rider Black'' gives me the shivers." The logo, designed by calligrapher Souun Takeda, was also unveiled. The series was given a release date of Spring 2022, with Toei "considering" a simultaneous worldwide release.

Higuchi and Taguchi's involvement was confirmed on October 4, 2021, with the pair and Shiraishi appearing in a special interview on the program's website. A crowdfunding campaign was also announced, with rewards including a limited re-issue of the original Kamen Rider Black transformation belt toy and the chance to appear on the show as an extra.

A press conference was announced on October 4 and held on November 20, posted on Toei's YouTube channel. The casting of leads Hidetoshi Nishijima as Kohtaro Minami / Kamen Rider Black Sun and Tomoya Nakamura as Nobuhiko Akizuki / Kamen Rider Shadow Moon was revealed.

At a Tamashii Nations event on November 21, Toei released the first concept images of the titular character as well as teasing upcoming toys for the series. A redesigned version of Kamen Rider Black's bike, the Battle Hopper, was also unveiled, later being put on display at the 2021 Yokohama Hot Rod Show on December 5 to further promote the series.

On March 19, 2022, it was announced that filming had wrapped and a new release date of Fall 2022 was given. The official website also revealed the first photographs of Kamen Rider Black Sun and Kamen Rider Shadow Moon, as well as their respective motorcycles, Battle Hopper and Road Sector.

The first teaser trailer and posters were revealed on June 12, 2022, along with the announcement that the series would premiere through Amazon Prime Video. The same day, the official website was updated with additional staff information. A Bandai Spirits livestream on June 16 unveiled the SH Figuarts figure of the title character and an extended version of the teaser.

Cast
: 
: 
Young Kotaro Minami: 
: 
: 
: 
Young Darom: 
: 
Young Bishium: 
: 
: 
: 
: 
: 
: 
: 
: 
Young Shinichi Donami: 
: 
Secretary-General: 
: 
: 
: 
: 
: 
: 
: 
: 
: 
: 
11-year-old Kotaro Minami: 
11-year-old Nobuhiko Akizuki: 
: 
:

Theme song
"Did you see the sunrise?"
Lyrics & Composition: 
Arrangement: Scrambles
Artist:

References

External links
Official website 
Official website at Amazon

2022 Japanese television series debuts
Alternate history television series
Amazon Prime Video original programming
Dark fantasy television series
Japanese drama television series
Japanese fantasy television series
Kamen Rider television series
Television series reboots